Brandenberg is a municipality in the Austrian state of Tyrol in the district Kufstein. It consists of the Brandenberg village and the Aschau locality (German: Ortsteil).

Brandenberg was first mentioned in 1140, and became an independent municipality in the beginning of the 19th century. The municipality is located in the valley of the Brandenberger Ache river, a tributary of the Inn River. To the north, it shares a border with Germany. Neighbouring Austrian and German municipalities are Achenkirch, Breitenbach am Inn, Kramsach, Kreuth, Rottach-Egern, Steinberg am Rofan, and Thiersee.

A local specialty is the Prügeltorte cake.

References

External links
 Website of the Brandenberg Tourist Board

Cities and towns in Kufstein District